Fernand G. Dubé  (December 29, 1928 – October 5, 1999) was a Canadian lawyer and politician in the Province of New Brunswick.

He graduated from the University of Ottawa in Ottawa and obtained a law degree from the University of New Brunswick in Fredericton. Dubé practised law in Campbellton, New Brunswick and in 1970-71 served as president of the Campbellton Tigers ice hockey club whose 1972 team would be inducted in the New Brunswick Sports Hall of Fame.

Fernand Dubé ran as the Progressive Conservative Party of Canada in the Restigouche—Madawaska, New Brunswick riding in the 1965 federal election, losing to Liberal incumbent, Jean-Eudes Dubé. Following the resignation of Charles Van Horne, in a September 1974 provincial by-election Dubé was elected to the Legislative Assembly of New Brunswick as the Progressive Conservative member for the riding of Campbellton-Restigouche Centre and would be re-elected in 1978, and again in 1982.

On December 3, 1974 Premier Richard Hatfield appointed Fernand Dubé to his Cabinet. During the ensuing thirteen years he held every major Cabinet portfolio. Dubé first served as the Minister of Tourism and Minister of the Environment, then on February 22, 1978 became Minister of Finance with the additional duty of Minister responsible for energy policy. After more than four and a half years in these portfolios, on October 30, 1982 he was appointed Minister of Justice then to his final Cabinet post on October 3, 1985 as the Minister of Commerce & Technology.

In the 1987 election, Fernand Dubé lost his seat to Liberal, Edmond Blanchard. On May 11, 1998, Dubé was elected Mayor of Campbellton. He died of a heart attack on October 4, 1999, in Montreal. Campbellton's City Hall park was named in his memory. His son, Jean F. Dubé, was elected to  the House of Commons of Canada and the Legislative Assembly of New Brunswick.

References

 Government of New Brunswick, cabinet holders
 CBC electoral riding profile
 Biography and cartoons at the Government of New Brunswick archives

1928 births
1999 deaths
Acadian people
University of Ottawa alumni
University of New Brunswick alumni
Lawyers in New Brunswick
Canadian King's Counsel
Progressive Conservative Party of New Brunswick MLAs
Members of the Executive Council of New Brunswick
Campbellton
People from Edmundston
20th-century Canadian lawyers
University of New Brunswick Faculty of Law alumni
Finance ministers of New Brunswick